James Campbell was a professional footballer who made one appearance in the Football League as a goalkeeper while on trial with Huddersfield Town.

Career statistics

References

English footballers
Association football goalkeepers
English Football League players
Huddersfield Town A.F.C. players
Year of birth missing
Year of death missing
Footballers from Greater London